Brighton is a small seaside town within the city limits of Dunedin on New Zealand's South Island.  It is located 20 kilometres southwest from the city centre on the Southern Scenic Route. The town faces a small bay which includes a broad sheltered beach. Other beaches extend from here. They make the area popular for summer day trips from Dunedin.

The town was named by an early resident, Hugh Williams, after Brighton in England.

Brighton is connected by coastal road with the Dunedin commuter settlement of Waldronville to the northeast (and from there to Dunedin itself) and with Taieri Mouth to the southwest. The settlement of Ocean View lies immediately to the east of Brighton, separated from it by a large bluff (simply known as "Big Rock") which juts towards the ocean to the northeast of Brighton Beach. The coast road winds around this headland on its entry to Brighton from Dunedin. At the southern end of the beach is the mouth of the Otokia Creek, a small stream which has its sources  to the southwest in the coastal hills which separate the coast from the Taieri Plains.

Demographics

Brighton had a population of 1,473 at the 2018 New Zealand census, an increase of 27 people (1.9%) since the 2013 census, and a decrease of 36 people (-2.4%) since the 2006 census. There were 615 households. There were 756 males and 717 females, giving a sex ratio of 1.05 males per female. The median age was 44.2 years (compared with 37.4 years nationally), with 264 people (17.9%) aged under 15 years, 213 (14.5%) aged 15 to 29, 768 (52.1%) aged 30 to 64, and 228 (15.5%) aged 65 or older.

Ethnicities were 93.5% European/Pākehā, 10.4% Māori, 1.6% Pacific peoples, 2.9% Asian, and 2.2% other ethnicities (totals add to more than 100% since people could identify with multiple ethnicities).

The proportion of people born overseas was 15.9%, compared with 27.1% nationally.

Although some people objected to giving their religion, 59.5% had no religion, 28.7% were Christian, 0.4% were Hindu, 0.2% were Buddhist and 2.6% had other religions.

Of those at least 15 years old, 243 (20.1%) people had a bachelor or higher degree, and 240 (19.9%) people had no formal qualifications. The median income was $34,400, compared with $31,800 nationally. 186 people (15.4%) earned over $70,000 compared to 17.2% nationally. The employment status of those at least 15 was that 645 (53.3%) people were employed full-time, 204 (16.9%) were part-time, and 39 (3.2%) were unemployed.

Education
Big Rock Primary School is a full primary school serving years 1 to 8 with a roll of  students as of  The school was created when Brighton and Ocean View schools merged in 2008.

Notable residents

James K. Baxter (1926–1972), a poet, grew up here.
Jeff Wilson, a former New Zealand internal rugby union player and husband of Adine Wilson lived here. 
Adine Wilson is a New Zealand international netball player and wife of Jeff Wilson.

Notes

Populated places in Otago
Southern Scenic Route
Suburbs of Dunedin
Beaches of Otago